TicBits Ltd. is a mobile game development company based in Turku, Finland, founded in 2010 by cousins Fredrik and Niklas Wahrman. The company specializes in both original games, mainly for the iOS platform, as well as its own interpretations of classic games. In Deloitte Technology Fast 50 Finland 2013, TicBits was placed third in the Rising Stars 2013 list. In July, 2016 Ticbits was acquired by ASX-listed mobile game developer Animoca Brands for 5.4 million AUD.

Games
In addition to developing classic games for mobile devices such as mahjong, minesweeper, solitaire, freecell, Sudoku, Ticbits has developed interpretations of other games, such as its match-three game Cruel Jewels, word games Jewel Words and Word Strike, and tower defense games Crazy Kings and Crazy Defense Heroes.

Current games
 Crazy Defense Heroes
 Crazy Kings 
 Cruel Jewels
 FreeCell :)
 iAssociate 2
 iAssociate 3
 Jewel Words
 Mahjong :)
 Minesweeper!
 Solitaire :)
 Solitaire Gold
 Sudoku :)
 Toon Match
 Unblock :)
 Word Strike

iAssociate 2

TicBits’ most popular game is iAssociate 2, the second version of iAssociate, a word association game developed by its CEO Fredrik Wahrman. The game was one of TUAW's favorite apps of 2009. The game was also mentioned on ABC’s Good Morning America. In addition, actress and talk show host Ricki Lake noted on Ustream in 2012 that iAssociate 2 was her favorite app at the time.

References

External links
Official website
iAssociate 2 website

Privately held companies of Finland
Video game companies of Finland
Mobile game companies
Video game companies established in 2010
Finnish companies established in 2010
Turku